Ganpathi Naresh Patwari (born 13 December 1972) is an Indian chemist and a professor at the Department of Chemistry of the Indian Institute of Technology Bombay. Known for his studies on vibrational spectroscopy, his work is reported to have widened the understanding of the fundamental concepts in hydrogen bonding.

Born on 13 December 1972 at Bodhan Mandal, Nizamabad district in the south Indian state of undivided Andhra Pradesh (presently in Telangana), Naresh Patwari did his early schooling at his home village. His undergraduate studies were at Osmania University and after earning a BSc in 1992, he moved to the University of Hyderabad to complete his master's degree (MSc) in 1994. Subsequently, he enrolled for doctoral research at Tata Institute of Fundamental Research to secure PhD in 2000 after which he did post-doctoral work at Tohoku University during 2000–02 on a fellowship awarded by Japan Society for the Promotion of Science and completed his post-doctoral work at University of Illinois at Urbana-Champaign in 2003. Returning to India, he joined the Indian Institute of Technology, Bombay in April 2003 as an assistant professor, became an associate professor in 2007 and holds the position of a professor since 2012.

Patwari's studies have been documented by way of a number of articles and ResearchGate, an online article repository of scientific articles, has listed several of them. He has also delivered invited talks at many seminars and conferees. The Council of Scientific and Industrial Research, the apex agency of the Government of India for scientific research, awarded him the Shanti Swarup Bhatnagar Prize for Science and Technology, one of the highest Indian science awards, for his contributions to chemical sciences in 2017.

Selected bibliography

See also 
 Rotational–vibrational spectroscopy

Notes

References

Further reading

External links 
 
 

Recipients of the Shanti Swarup Bhatnagar Award in Engineering Science
Indian scientific authors
1972 births
Living people
Indian inorganic chemists
Scientists from Telangana
People from Nizamabad district
Osmania University alumni
University of Hyderabad alumni
Tata Institute of Fundamental Research alumni
Academic staff of IIT Bombay
Tohoku University alumni
University of Illinois Urbana-Champaign alumni